Andrew Mark "Andy" Berman (born February 24, 1968) is an American actor, director, producer, writer, and comedian. He is best known for his role as Dib Membrane in Invader Zim, Dennis in The Jamie Foxx Show (1996-1997), Chuck in The Wonder Years (1991-1993), and Guy in Psych (2006-2014).

Early life
Berman was born Andrew Mark Berman in Chicago, Illinois, on February 24, 1968. He is the brother of Lauren Berman Rawitz, herself a theatre and television actress whose credits include appearances on Mr. Belvedere and The Young and the Restless.

Career
Berman produced and wrote for some various television series, such as being the director, executive producer, and writer for Psych and as the writer for Freddie.

He voiced Dib Membrane on the animated television series Invader Zim. After the show's cancellation, he would reprise his role in the crossover video game SpongeBob SquarePants featuring Nicktoons: Globs of Doom, and later in the Netflix movie Invader Zim: Enter the Florpus.

Filmography

Film

Television

Video games

References

External links
 
 "Interview with Andy Berman," Pineapple Radio, March 8, 2012. (Audio.)

1968 births
Living people
American male comedians
American male film actors
American male television actors
American male television writers
American male voice actors
Jewish American male actors
Male actors from Chicago
Screenwriters from Illinois
21st-century American Jews
20th-century American male actors
21st-century American male actors